Gunsberg may refer to:
Isidor Gunsberg, a Hungarian chess player
Andrew Günsberg, an Australian radio and television presenter
Rudolf Günsberg, a Ukrainian chemist
Günsberg, a municipality in Solothurn, Switzerland